The 2019–20 Drexel Dragons men's basketball team represents Drexel University during the 2019–20 NCAA Division I men's basketball season. The Dragons, led by fourth-year head coach Zach Spiker, play their home games at the Daskalakis Athletic Center in Philadelphia, Pennsylvania as members of the Colonial Athletic Association.

Previous season

The Dragons finished the 2018–19 season 13–19,  7–11 in CAA play to finish in a tie for 6th place. They lost to Charleston in the CAA tournament.

Offseason

Departures

2019 recruiting class

Class of 2020 early commitments

Preseason 
In a poll of the league coaches, media relations directors, and media members at the CAA's media day, Drexel was picked to finish in eighth place in the CAA. Sophomore guard Camren Wynter was named as an honorable mention to the preseason All-Conference second team.

Roster

Senior guard Kurk Lee Jr left the team for personal reasons on 13 November 2019.

Schedule and results

|-
!colspan=12 style=| Non-conference regular season
|-

|-
!colspan=12 style=| CAA regular season
|-

|-
!colspan=12 style=| CAA Tournament
|-

Source

Awards and honors
James Butler
CAA All-Conference Third Team
Preseason CAA All-Conference Honorable Mention
"Sweep" Award (team leader in blocks)

Sam Green
Donald Shank Spirit & Dedication Award

Matej Juric
Dragon "D" Award (team's top defensive player)
Team Academic Award

Coletrane Washington
Samuel D. Cozen Award (team's most improved player)

Camren Wynter
CAA All-Conference Second Team
CAA Player of the Week
Preseason CAA All-Conference Second Team
Team Most Valuable Player
Assist Award (team leader in assists)
Battle of the Boardwalk MVP

See also
 2019–20 Drexel Dragons women's basketball team

References

Drexel
Drexel Dragons men's basketball seasons
Drexel
Drexel